Clematodes is a genus of short-horned grasshoppers in the family Acrididae. There are at least two described species in Clematodes.

Species
These two species belong to the genus Clematodes:
 Clematodes larreae Cockerell, 1901 (gray creosotebush grasshopper)
 Clematodes vanduzeei Hebard, 1923 (papago creosotebush grasshopper)

References

Further reading

 
 

Acrididae
Articles created by Qbugbot